Hitler Strikes Poland: Blitzkrieg, Ideology, and Atrocity is a 2003 book by Alexander B. Rossino about the German invasion of Poland and its subsequent occupation.

References

External links
 Gordon, Craig A. (4 December 2003). "The Goblin at War". The New York Review of Books.

2003 non-fiction books
History books about Poland
History books about World War II
21st-century history books